Josephine Victoria "Joy" Behar (née Occhiuto) is an American comedian, television host, actress, and writer. She co-hosts the ABC daytime talk show The View, where she is the only original panelist still regularly appearing. She hosted The Joy Behar Show on HLN from 2009 to 2011 and Joy Behar: Say Anything! on Current TV, from 2012 until the channel switched formats in August 2013. Behar's latest weekly late-night talk show, Late Night Joy, aired on TLC in 2015. She also wrote The Great Gasbag: An A–Z Study Guide to Surviving Trump World.

Early life
Behar was born Josephine Victoria Occhiuto in 1942 in Williamsburg, Brooklyn, the only child to a Roman Catholic family of Italian descent. Her mother, Rose (née Carbone), was a seamstress, and her father, Gino Occhiuto, was a truck driver for Coca-Cola. Behar earned a BA in sociology from Queens College in 1964 and an MA in English education from Stony Brook University in 1966. From the late 1960s to the early 1970s, she taught English on Long Island at Lindenhurst Senior High School in Lindenhurst, New York. She studied acting at the HB Studio.

Career

Career beginnings
Behar started her career in show business in the early 1980s as a receptionist and later a producer on Good Morning America.

She was a stand-up comedian and made appearances on ABC's Good Morning America and The New Show, a short-lived Lorne Michaels NBC project. In 1987, she hosted a variety talk show on Lifetime Television called Way Off Broadway that  included Larry David as a writer and performer. She also hosted the show Live from Queens; was a regular on NBC's Baby Boom; and continued to work the comedy club circuit.  She had minor film roles including Cookie, This Is My Life, and Manhattan Murder Mystery. In the early 1990s, she hosted a talk-show on 77 WABC radio in New York City. She also made appearances on HBO comedy specials One Night Stand and Women of the Night 2.

The View

In 1997, Behar became one of the original panelists of the ABC daytime talk show The View, which was co-created by Barbara Walters. Behar originally appeared only on the days when Walters was off, but she ultimately became a permanent co-host. Behar occasionally hosted a segment called "Joy's Comedy Corner" in which she presented both established and up-and-coming comedians.

In August 2009, Behar and the other co-hosts, Whoopi Goldberg, Elisabeth Hasselbeck, Sherri Shepherd, and Walters, won a Daytime Emmy Award for Outstanding Talk Show Host following over a decade of nominations for the show.

On March 7, 2013, it was announced that Behar would be leaving the show at the end of that season. She told Deadline, "It seemed like the right time...You reach a point when you say to yourself, 'Do I want to keep doing this?' There are other things on my plate I want to do — I've been writing a play, I've been neglecting my standup". Her last show was on August 9, 2013 in which the program staged a This Is Your Life-style tribute to Behar.

After departing in 2013, Behar continued to guest co-host throughout 2014 and 2015. On August 25, 2015, ABC announced that Behar would return as a regular co-host starting with the premiere of the 19th season on September 8, 2015. Behar was quoted as saying, "Just when I thought I was out, they pulled me back in. Plus, Steve was getting tired of applauding every time I gave my opinion. But I'm happy to be back home. And I'm looking forward to sticking my two cents into the hot topics, especially now that Hillary and the Donald are in the spotlight."

During a discussion about the 89th Miss America pageant in 2015, Behar referenced contestant Kelley Johnson's attire during her monologue and questioned why she had on "a doctor's stethoscope". Behar's remark, in addition to fellow co-host Michelle Collins', resulted in an immediate social media backlash from the nursing profession, including the hashtag #NursesUnite. Behar and Collins later addressed the controversy on air. Consequently, multiple companies pulled their sponsorships from the series.

In 2018, while analyzing television personality Omarosa's comments in regards to U.S. Vice President Mike Pence's religiosity, Behar stated: "It's one thing to talk to Jesus, it's another thing when Jesus talks to you. That's called mental illness, if I'm not correct, hearing voices." Content analysis organization Media Research Center subsequently launched a campaign demanding an apology from Behar and urging viewers to do the same, resulting in 40,000 calls to ABC as well as 6,000 complaints to the show's advertisers. Pence himself responded and accused the show of expressing "religious intolerance". The Walt Disney Company CEO Bob Iger later stated that Behar has directly apologized to Pence. On March 13, she issued an apology on air, stating: "I think Vice President Pence is right; I was raised to respect everyone's religious faith, and I fell short of that. I sincerely apologize for what I said."

The Joy Behar Show
Beginning in 2007, she occasionally filled in as a guest host on Larry King Live. On June 11, 2009, Behar announced that she would be hosting her own news/talk program on CNN's HLN beginning in the fall of 2009, titled The Joy Behar Show. She did not leave The View but worked on both shows simultaneously. Despite reportedly being the network's second-highest-rated show, HLN decided to cancel the talk show after only two years. The final broadcast of The Joy Behar Show aired on December 15, 2011.

Joy Behar: Say Anything!
In June 2012, it was formally announced that Behar would be getting another talk show, Joy Behar: Say Anything!, premiering September 4, 2012 on the Current TV network. Before the new show's launch, Behar began acting as fill-in host for Eliot Spitzer's Current TV talk show, Viewpoint with Eliot Spitzer, starting on July 18, 2012. The show ended in August 2013 due to Current TV being purchased by Al Jazeera and being replaced by Al Jazeera America.

Late Night Joy
Behar's short-lived weekly late night talk show, Late Night Joy, premiered on TLC on November 4, 2015. Each episode features Behar having intimate chats with friends in her New York City apartment. It was cancelled after 5 episodes.

Other work
Behar has performed in theatrical plays, including The Food Chain, The Vagina Monologues, and Love, Loss and What I Wore. She has also performed in an Off-Broadway one-woman show entitled Me, My Mouth and I.

She has written multiple books, such as a collection of humorous essays and stories called Joy Shtick — Or What is the Existential Vacuum and Does It Come with Attachments? and a children's book called Sheetzucacapoopoo: My Kind of Dog, published in 2006.

She appeared on the eighth season of Bravo's Celebrity Poker Showdown and finished in fourth place, behind Robin Tunney, Christopher Meloni and Macy Gray, but ahead of Andy Dick. She played for the U.S. Fund for UNICEF. On October 27, 2017, Behar appeared as a guest on Real Time with Bill Maher.

Behar portrayed the role of Dr. Lucy in the 2011 comedy film Hall Pass. She also recurred in Woody Allen's Amazon series, Crisis in Six Scenes.

Personal life
Behar married college professor Joe Behar in 1965. They divorced in 1981. They have one daughter, Eve Behar Scotti. Behar has a grandson named Luca. Behar began to date Steve Janowitz in 1982; they married in 2011.

Behar resides in The Hamptons. She also owns a home on the Upper West Side of Manhattan. She is a Democrat.

Filmography

Film

Television

Stage

Bibliography
Behar has authored several books, including several children's books:

 The Great Gasbag: An A–Z Study Guide to Surviving Trump World (2017)
 Sheetzucacapoopoo 2: Max Goes to the Dogs (2009)
 When You Need a Lift: But Don't Want to Eat Chocolate, Pay a Shrink, or Drink a Bottle of Gin (2007)
 Sheetzu Caca Poopoo: My Kind of Dog (2006)
 Joy Shtick: Or What Is the Existential Vacuum and Does It Come with Attachments (1999)

Awards and nominations

See also
 Broadcast journalism
 New Yorkers in journalism

References

Further reading

External links

ABC News: Joy Behar on Faith Part One
ABC News: Joy Behar on Faith Part Two

|-

Living people
American television talk show hosts
Daytime Emmy Award for Outstanding Talk Show Host winners
Current TV people
American stand-up comedians
American women comedians
Comedians from New York City
American film actresses
American voice actresses
Actresses from New York City
20th-century American actresses
21st-century American actresses
American women television journalists
American television news anchors
American television reporters and correspondents
Journalists from New York City
CNN people
American children's writers
Writers from Brooklyn
20th-century American women writers
21st-century American women writers
21st-century American essayists
New York (state) Democrats
American agnostics
Schoolteachers from New York (state)
Queens College, City University of New York alumni
Stony Brook University alumni
Washington Irving High School (New York City) alumni
American writers of Italian descent
People from Lindenhurst, New York
People from Williamsburg, Brooklyn
1942 births